Kudoacanthus is a genus of plants in the family Acanthaceae. It contains a single species, Kudoacanthus albonervosus. It is endemic to Taiwan.

When published the epithet of the name was written as "albo-nervosa". However, according to ICBN (Vienna Code), there are two errors in it that should be corrected. The hyphen should be dropped and the gender be consistent with the genus name which, with "Acanthus" as the last part, is masculine.

References

Acanthaceae
Taxonomy articles created by Polbot
Acanthaceae genera
Monotypic Lamiales genera
Taxobox binomials not recognized by IUCN